Softly from Paris (originally Série rose) is a 1986−1991 erotic French television series produced by Pierre Grimblat and initially broadcast on France 3. 26 episodes of 28 minutes each were produced.

Plot 
Softly from Paris is an anthology series where each episode features an author.

Episodes 
List of episodes with main characters and director.
 "Augustine de Villebranche" (Marquis de Sade - Alain Schwartzstein)
 "La Fessée" (Marguerite de Navarre - Harry Kümel)
 "Le Libertin de qualité" (Comte de Mirabeau - Juan Luis Buñuel)
 "L'élève" (Nicolas-Edme Rétif - Harry Kumel)
 "La Serre" (Guy de Maupassant - Harry Kumel)
 "Une villa à la campagne" (Anton Chekhov - Maurice Fasquel)
 "Le Demi-mariage ou Le triomphe de la vertu" (Nicolas Edme Restif de La Bretonne - Harry Kumel)
 "Le Partenaire inattendu" (Geoffrey Chaucer - Alain Schwartzstein)
 "La Revanche" (Guy De Maupassant - Harry Kumel)
 "La Mandragore" (Niccolò Machiavelli & Jean de La Fontaine - Harry Kumel)
 "L'Épreuve de l'amour" (Giuseppe Celentano - Alain Schwartzstein)
 "Elle et lui" (Marquis de Mirabeau Mirabeau - Jaime Chavarri) 
 "Almanach des adresses des demoiselles de Paris" (anonyme 1791 - Walerian Borowczyk)
 "Un traitement justifié" (Giovanni Boccaccio - Walerian Borowczyk)
 "La Dame galante" (Pierre de Bourdeille, seigneur de Brantôme - Don Kent)
 "Les Leçons de Bucciuolo" (Ser Giovanni Fiorentino - Péter Gárdos)
 "La Conversion" (Andrea de Nerciat - Christian Faure)
 "Le Lotus d'or" (Jin Ping Mei - Walerian Borowczyk)
 "L'Experte Halima" (One Thousand and One Nights - Walerian Borowczyk)
 "À la feuille de rose, maison turque" (Guy de Maupassant - Michel Boisrond)
 "La Gageure des trois commères" (Jean De La Fontaine - Michel Boisrond)
 "Hercule aux pieds d'Omphale" (Théophile Gautier - Michel Boisrond)
 "Le Style Pompadour" (Marquis de Foudras - Michel Boisrond)
 "Lady Roxanne" (Daniel Defoe - Jaime Chavarri) 
 "La Grève de l'amour" (Lysistrata d'Aristophane - Nino Monti)
 "Le Signe" (Guy de Maupassant - Fred Hilberdink)

French anthology television series
1980s French television series
1990s French television series
1986 French television series debuts
1991 French television series endings
French-language television shows
Erotic television series

de:Erotisches zur Nacht
es:Serie rosa
fr:Série rose